1776 Returns is the title of a document that outlined strategic plans for the takeover of US government buildings on January 6, 2021. It was circulated among the Proud Boys organization. The nine-page document was sent to Enrique Tarrio, Chairman of the Proud Boys, one week before the January 6 United States Capitol attack, by a Miami-based cryptocurrency promoter named Eryka Gemma Flores.

The document laid out a plan for the occupation of eight key buildings in the District of Columbia on January 6, 2021. This included House and Senate office buildings and the Supreme Court. The strategy included a call for the mass-mobilization of followers, invoking the sentiment and spirit of 1776 and the 1917 storming of the Winter Palace by Bolsheviks in the Russian Revolution.

A five-stage plan was formulated, that encouraged protesters to:
"Infiltrate"
"Execute"
"Distract (if necessary)"
"Occupy"
"Sit-In"
 
1776 Returns recommended groups of 50 to occupy government buildings and conduct sit-ins, along with suggested slogans to chant. It was suggested that protesters should be able to blend in and appear "unsuspecting" and to "not look tactical". A section titled the "Patriot Plan" was intended for public distribution, calling on people to gather at 1pm and wait for a signal to commence the prepared attacks. The target locations were the Russell Senate Office Building, Dirksen Senate Office Building, Hart Senate Office Building, US Supreme Court Building, Cannon House Office Building, Longworth House Office Building, Rayburn House Office Building, and the DC office building of CNN.

"Special mentions" included warnings to Mitch McConnell, Kevin McCarthy, Mike Pence, and Bill Gates as well as praise of Rand Paul and Ron DeSantis. Though the Capitol Building is not mentioned by name, the final page of the document is a Google Maps screenshot, showing the Capitol and surrounding targeted buildings in the United States Capitol Complex.

The author of 1776 Returns is unknown. However, testimony from the January 6th Committee has shown that Samuel Armes, a cryptocurrency business owner from Florida, says he had indirectly provided inspiration for the document. He claims to have written a similar three to five page "war gaming" plan, which he then shared with Erika Flores, another member of Miami's crypto advocacy community. Both Armes and Flores had ties to Enrique Tarrio. Flores has said that Armes is the author of 1776 Returns, a claim which Armes refutes and has called "blame-shifting".

See also 
 Attempts to overturn the 2020 United States presidential election
 Public hearings of the United States House Select Committee on the January 6 Attack
 United States House Select Committee on the January 6 Attack
 United States Justice Department investigation into attempts to overturn the 2020 presidential election

References

External links 
 1776 Returns
 Samuel Armes January 6th Testimony Transcript
 Tarrio et al Third Superseding Indictment (pp. 12)

Proud Boys
Military plans
Works about coups d'état
Fascist works
2020 documents
Groups and movements involved with the January 6 United States Capitol attack
Works published anonymously